Saya Sakakibara (born 23 August 1999) is an Australian cyclist competing in BMX Supercross events.

Personal and early life
Sakakibara was born in Australia to a mother of Japanese heritage and a father of British heritage. She started BMX racing at the age of four after watching her older brother competing. The family  moved to Sydney in 2007 and Sakakibara joined the South Illawarra BMX Club where her brother Kai was a member. She then began competing on the junior circuits and quickly rose through the ranks winning state and national titles.

Career
Sakakibara has represented Australia at World Championship level. She won a silver medal in the Junior Elite BMX Supercross at the 2017 World Championships. She was awarded AusCycling's Female BMX Racing Rider of the Year in 2020. She was selected for the delayed 2020 Tokyo Olympic Games as part of the Australian team. She crashed in the semi-finals of the Olympics and didn't qualify for the final. Her accident was one of the scariest moments of the games, while her post-race heartbreak was one of the saddest.

Major results

2016
 1st Junior Elite BMX Supercross National Championships
 1st Junior Elite BMX Supercross Oceania Championships
2017
 1st Junior Elite BMX Supercross National Championships
 1st Junior Elite BMX Supercross Oceania Championships
 2nd Junior Elite BMX Supercross World Championships
2018
 6th Elite BMX Supercross World Championships
2019
 1st Elite BMX Supercross Oceania Championships
 1st Elite Tokyo 2020 BMX Test Event
 7th Elite BMX Supercross World Championships
2021
 1st Superclass Women BMX National Championships

References

External links
 
 
 
 

1999 births
Living people
BMX riders
Australian female cyclists
Olympic cyclists of Australia
Cyclists at the 2020 Summer Olympics
Australian people of British descent
Australian people of Japanese descent